

Events

Pre-1600
 218 – Battle of Antioch: With the support of the Syrian legions, Elagabalus defeats the forces of emperor Macrinus.
 452 – Attila leads a Hun army in the invasion of Italy, devastating the northern provinces as he heads for Rome. 
 793 – Vikings raid the abbey at Lindisfarne in Northumbria, commonly accepted as the beginning of Norse activity in the British Isles.
1042 – Edward the Confessor becomes King of England – the country's penultimate Anglo-Saxon king.
1191 – Richard I arrives in Acre, beginning the Third Crusade.

1601–1900
1663 – Portuguese Restoration War: Portuguese victory at the Battle of Ameixial ensures Portugal's independence from Spain.
1772 – Alexander Fordyce flees to France to avoid debt repayment, triggering the credit crisis of 1772 in the British Empire and the Dutch Republic.
1776 – American Revolutionary War: Continental Army attackers are driven back at the Battle of Trois-Rivières.
1783 – Laki, a volcano in Iceland, begins an eight-month eruption which kills over 9,000 people and starts a seven-year famine.
1789 – James Madison introduces twelve proposed amendments to the United States Constitution in Congress.
1794 – Maximilien Robespierre inaugurates the French Revolution's new state religion, the Cult of the Supreme Being, with large organized festivals all across France.
1861 – American Civil War: Tennessee secedes from the Union.
1862 – American Civil War: A Confederate victory by forces under General Stonewall Jackson at the Battle of Cross Keys, along with the Battle of Port Republic the next day, prevents Union forces from reinforcing General George B. McClellan in his Peninsula campaign.
1867 – Coronation of Franz Joseph as King of Hungary following the Austro-Hungarian compromise (Ausgleich).
1887 – Herman Hollerith applies for US patent #395,781 for the 'Art of Compiling Statistics', which was his punched card calculator.

1901–present
1906 – Theodore Roosevelt signs the Antiquities Act into law, authorizing the President to restrict the use of certain parcels of public land with historical or conservation value.
1912 – Carl Laemmle incorporates Universal Pictures.
1918 – A solar eclipse is observed at Baker City, Oregon by scientists and an artist hired by the United States Navy.
1928 – Second Northern Expedition: The National Revolutionary Army captures Peking, whose name is changed to Beijing ("Northern Capital").
1929 – Margaret Bondfield is appointed Minister of Labour. She is the first woman appointed to the Cabinet of the United Kingdom.
1940 – World War II: The completion of Operation Alphabet, the evacuation of Allied forces from Narvik at the end of the Norwegian Campaign.
1941 – World War II: The Allies commence the Syria–Lebanon Campaign against the possessions of Vichy France in the Levant.
1942 – World War II: The Imperial Japanese Navy submarines I-21 and I-24 shell the Australian cities of Sydney and Newcastle.
1949 – Helen Keller, Dorothy Parker, Danny Kaye, Fredric March, John Garfield, Paul Muni and Edward G. Robinson are named in an FBI report as Communist Party members.
  1949   – George Orwell's Nineteen Eighty-Four is published.
1953 – An F5 tornado hits Beecher, Michigan, killing 116, injuring 844, and destroying 340 homes.
  1953   – The United States Supreme Court rules in District of Columbia v. John R. Thompson Co. that restaurants in Washington, D.C., cannot refuse to serve black patrons.
1959 –  and the United States Postal Service attempt the delivery of mail via Missile Mail.
1966 – An F-104 Starfighter collides with XB-70 Valkyrie prototype no. 2, destroying both aircraft during a photo shoot near Edwards Air Force Base. Joseph A. Walker, a NASA test pilot, and Carl Cross, a United States Air Force test pilot, are both killed.
  1966   – Topeka, Kansas, is devastated by a tornado that registers as an "F5" on the Fujita scale: The first to exceed US$100 million in damages. Sixteen people are killed, hundreds more injured, and thousands of homes damaged or destroyed.
  1966   – The National Football League and American Football League announced a merger effective in 1970.
1967 – Six-Day War: The USS Liberty incident occurs, killing 34 and wounding 171.
1968 – James Earl Ray, the man who assassinated Martin Luther King Jr. is arrested at London Heathrow Airport.
1972 – Vietnam War: Nine-year-old Phan Thị Kim Phúc is burned by napalm, an event captured by Associated Press photographer Nick Ut moments later while the young girl is seen running naked down a road, in what would become an iconic, Pulitzer Prize-winning photo.
  1982   – VASP Flight 168 crashes in Pacatuba, Ceará, Brazil, killing 128 people.
1984 – Homosexuality is decriminalized in the Australian state of New South Wales.
1987 – New Zealand's Labour government establishes a national nuclear-free zone under the New Zealand Nuclear Free Zone, Disarmament, and Arms Control Act 1987.
1992 – The first World Oceans Day is celebrated, coinciding with the Earth Summit held in Rio de Janeiro, Brazil.
1995 – Downed U.S. Air Force pilot Captain Scott O'Grady is rescued by U.S. Marines in Bosnia.
2001 – Mamoru Takuma kills eight and injures 15 in a mass stabbing at an elementary school in the Osaka Prefecture of Japan.
2004 – The first Venus Transit in well over a century takes place, the previous one being in 1882.
2008 – At least 37 miners go missing after an explosion in a Ukrainian coal mine causes it to collapse.
  2008   – At least seven people are killed and ten injured in a stabbing spree in Tokyo, Japan.
2009 – Two American journalists are found guilty of illegally entering North Korea and sentenced to 12 years of penal labour.
2014 – At least 28 people are killed in an attack at Jinnah International Airport, Karachi, Pakistan.

Births

Pre-1600
 862 – Emperor Xizong of Tang (d. 888)
1508 – Primož Trubar, Slovenian Protestant reformer (d. 1586)
1552 – Gabriello Chiabrera, Italian poet and author (d. 1638)
1593 – George I Rákóczi, prince of Transylvania (d. 1648)

1601–1900
1625 – Giovanni Domenico Cassini, Italian-French mathematician and astronomer (d. 1712)
1671 – Tomaso Albinoni, Italian violinist and composer (d. 1751)
1717 – John Collins, American lawyer and politician, 3rd Governor of Rhode Island (d. 1795)
1724 – John Smeaton, English engineer, designed the Coldstream Bridge and Perth Bridge (d. 1794)
1745 – Caspar Wessel, Norwegian-Danish mathematician and cartographer (d. 1818)
1757 – Ercole Consalvi, Italian cardinal (d. 1824)
1788 – Charles A. Wickliffe, American politician, 14th Governor of Kentucky (d. 1869)
1810 – Robert Schumann, German composer and critic (d. 1856)
1829 – John Everett Millais, English painter and illustrator (d. 1896)
1831 – Thomas J. Higgins, Canadian-American sergeant, Medal of Honor recipient (d. 1917)
1842 – John Q. A. Brackett, American lawyer and politician, 36th Governor of Massachusetts (d. 1918)
1851 – Jacques-Arsène d'Arsonval, French physician and physicist (d. 1940)
1852 – Guido Banti, Italian physician and pathologist (d. 1925)
1854 – Douglas Cameron, Canadian politician, 8th Lieutenant Governor of Manitoba (d. 1921)
1855 – George Charles Haité, English painter and illustrator (d. 1924)
1858 – Charlotte Scott, English mathematician (d. 1931)
1859 – Smith Wigglesworth, English evangelist (d. 1947)
1860 – Alicia Boole Stott, Irish-English mathematician and theorist (d. 1940)
1867 – Frank Lloyd Wright, American architect, designed the Price Tower and Fallingwater (d. 1959)
1868 – Robert Robinson Taylor, American architect (d. 1942)
1872 – Jan Frans De Boever, Belgian painter and illustrator (d. 1949)
1875 – Ernst Enno, Estonian poet and author (d. 1934)
1876 – Alexandre Tuffère, Greek-French triple jumper (d. 1958)
1878 – Evan Roberts, Welsh Revivalist minister  (d. 1951)
1885 – Karl Genzken, German physician (d. 1957)
1891 – William Funnell, Australian public servant (d. 1962)
1893 – Ernst Marcus, German zoologist (d. 1968)
  1893   – Gaby Morlay, French actress (d. 1964)
1894 – Erwin Schulhoff, Czech composer and pianist (d. 1942)
1895 – Santiago Bernabéu Yeste, Spanish footballer and manager (d. 1978)
1897 – John G. Bennett, English mathematician and technologist (d. 1974)
1899 – Eugène Lapierre, Canadian organist, composer and arts administrator (d. 1970)
  1899   – Ernst-Robert Grawitz, German physician (d. 1945)
1900 – Lena Baker, African-American maid executed for capital murder, later pardoned posthumously (d. 1945)

1901–present
1903 – Ralph Yarborough, American lawyer and politician (d. 1996)
  1903   – Marguerite Yourcenar, Belgian-French author and poet (d. 1987)
1910 – John W. Campbell, American journalist and author (d. 1971)
  1910   – Fernand Fonssagrives, French-American photographer, sculptor, and painter (d. 2003)
1911 – Edmundo Rivero, Argentinian singer-songwriter (d. 1986)
1912 – Wilhelmina Barns-Graham, British abstract painter (d. 2004)
  1912   – Maurice Bellemare, Canadian lawyer and politician (d. 1989)
  1912   – Harry Holtzman, American painter (d. 1987)
1915 – Kayyar Kinhanna Rai, Indian journalist, author, and poet (d. 2015)
1916 – Francis Crick, English biologist, biophysicist, and neuroscientist, Nobel Prize laureate (d. 2004)
  1916   – Luigi Comencini, Italian director and screenwriter (d. 2007)
  1916   – Richard Pousette-Dart, American painter and educator (d. 1992)
1917 – Byron White, American football player, lawyer and judge (d. 2002)
1918 – George Edward Hughes, Irish-New Zealand philosopher and logician (d. 1994)
  1918   – Robert Preston, American actor and singer (d. 1987)
  1918   – John D. Roberts, American chemist and academic (d. 2016)
1919 – John R. Deane, Jr., American general (d. 2013)
1920 – Gwen Harwood, Australian poet and playwright (d. 1995)
1921 – Gordon McLendon, American broadcaster and businessman (d. 1986)
  1921   – Olga Nardone, American actress (d. 2010)
  1921   – LeRoy Neiman, American painter (d. 2012)
  1921   – Alexis Smith, Canadian-born American actress and singer (d. 1993)
  1921   – Suharto, Indonesian soldier and politician, 2nd President of Indonesia (d. 2008)
1924 – Billie Dawe, Canadian ice hockey player and manager (d. 2013)
  1924   – Kenneth Waltz, American political scientist and academic (d. 2013)
1925 – Barbara Bush, American wife of George H. W. Bush, 41st First Lady of the United States (d. 2018)
1927 – Jerry Stiller, American actor, comedian and producer (d. 2020)
1929 – Nada Inada, Japanese psychiatrist and author (d. 2013)
1930 – Robert Aumann, German-American mathematician and economist, Nobel Prize laureate
  1930   – Marcel Léger, Canadian lawyer and politician (d. 1993)
1931 – James Goldstone, American director and screenwriter (d. 1999)
  1931   – Dana Wynter, British actress (d. 2011)
1932 – Ray Illingworth, English cricketer and sportscaster (d. 2021)
  1932   – Ian Kirkwood, Lord Kirkwood, Scottish lawyer and judge (d. 2017)
1933 – Rommie Loudd, American football player and coach (d. 1998)
  1933   – Joan Rivers, American comedian, actress, and television host (d. 2014)
1934 – Millicent Martin, English actress and singer
1935 – Molade Okoya-Thomas, Nigerian businessman and philanthropist (d. 2015)
1936 – James Darren, American actor
  1936   – Kenneth G. Wilson, American physicist and academic, Nobel Prize laureate (d. 2013)
1937 – Gillian Clarke, Welsh poet and playwright
1938 – Angelo Amato, Italian cardinal
1940 – Nancy Sinatra, American singer and actress
1941 – Robert Bradford, Northern Irish politician and activist (d. 1981)
  1941   – George Pell, Australian cardinal (d. 2023)
1942 – Nikos Konstantopoulos, Greek politician, Greek Minister of the Interior
  1942   – Doug Mountjoy, Welsh snooker player (d. 2021)
1943 – Colin Baker, English actor
  1943   – William Calley, American military officer
  1943   – Willie Davenport, American hurdler (d. 2002)
  1943   – Peter Eggert, German footballer and manager
  1943   – Pierre-André Fournier, Roman Catholic archbishop (d. 2015)
1944 – Boz Scaggs, American singer-songwriter and guitarist 
1945 – Steven Fromholz, American singer-songwriter, producer, and poet (d. 2014)
  1945   – Derek Underwood, English cricketer
1946 – Graham Henry, New Zealand rugby player and coach
1947 – Annie Haslam, English singer-songwriter and painter 
  1947   – Sara Paretsky, American author
  1947   – Eric F. Wieschaus, American biologist, geneticist, and academic Nobel Prize laureate
1949 – Emanuel Ax, Polish-American pianist and educator
  1949   – Hildegard Falck, German runner
1950 – Kathy Baker, American actress
  1950   – Sônia Braga, Brazilian actress and producer
1951 – Bonnie Tyler, Welsh singer-songwriter
1953 – Sandy Nairne, English historian and curator
  1953   – Ivo Sanader, Croatian historian and politician, 8th Prime Minister of Croatia
  1953   – Olav Stedje, Norwegian singer-songwriter
1954 – Kiril of Varna, Bulgarian metropolitan (d. 2013)
  1954   – Sergei Storchak, Ukrainian-Russian politician
1955 – Tim Berners-Lee, English computer scientist, invented the World Wide Web
  1955   – José Antonio Camacho, Spanish footballer and manager
  1955   – Griffin Dunne, American actor, director, and producer
1956 – Jonathan Potter, English psychologist, sociolinguist, and academic
1957 – Scott Adams, American author and illustrator
  1957   – Don Robinson, American baseball player and politician
  1957   – Sonja Vectomov, Czech/Finnish sculptor
1958 – Louise Richardson, Irish political scientist and academic
1959 – Mohsen Kadivar, Iranian philosopher
1960 – Neil Baker, Australian rugby league player
  1960   – Mick Hucknall, English singer-songwriter 
  1960   – Thomas Steen, Swedish ice hockey player and coach
1961 – Mary Bonauto, American lawyer and gay rights activist
1963 – Karen Kingsbury, American journalist and author
1964 – Butch Reynolds, American runner and coach
1965 – Kevin Farley, American screenwriter
1967 – Russell E. Morris, Welsh chemist and academic
1968 – Sharon Shannon, Irish traditional musician
1969 – David Barnhill, Australian rugby league player
1970 – Steve Renouf, Australian rugby league player
1975 – Mark Ricciuto, Australian footballer and sportcaster
1976 – Lindsay Davenport, American tennis player
1977 – Kanye West, American rapper, producer, director, and fashion designer
1978 – Maria Menounos, American television personality, professional wrestler, author, and actress
1981 – Rachel Held Evans, American Christian author (d. 2019)
1982 – Nadia Petrova, Russian tennis player
1983 – Kim Clijsters, Belgian tennis player; winner of six Grand Slam tournament titles.
1984 – Javier Mascherano, Argentinian footballer
1986 – Keith Gill, American financial analyst and investor
1989 – Timea Bacsinszky, Swiss tennis player
1997 – Jeļena Ostapenko, Latvian tennis player

Deaths

Pre-1600
 632 – Muhammad, the central figure of Islam. (b. 570/571)
 696 – Chlodulf, bishop of Metz (or 697)
 951 – Zhao Ying, Chinese chancellor (b. 885)
1042 – Harthacnut, English-Danish king (b. 1018)
1154 – William of York, English archbishop and saint
1290 – Beatrice Portinari, object of Dante Alighieri's adoration (b. 1266)
1376 – Edward, the Black Prince, English son of Edward III of England (b. 1330)
1383 – Thomas de Ros, 4th Baron de Ros, English politician (b. 1338)
1384 – Kan'ami, Japanese actor and playwright (b. 1333)
1405 – Richard le Scrope, Archbishop of York (b. c.1350)
  1405   – Thomas de Mowbray, 4th Earl of Norfolk (b. 1385)
1476 – George Neville, English archbishop and academic (b. 1432)
1492 – Elizabeth Woodville, Queen consort of England (b. 1437)
1501 – George Gordon, 2nd Earl of Huntly, Earl of Huntly and Lord Chancellor of Scotland (b. 1440)
1505 – Hongzhi Emperor of China (b. 1470)
1600 – Edward Fortunatus, German nobleman (b. 1565)

1601–1900
1611 – Jean Bertaut, French bishop and poet (b. 1552)
1612 – Hans Leo Hassler, German organist and composer (b. 1562)
1621 – Anne de Xainctonge, French saint, founded the Society of the Sisters of Saint Ursula of the Blessed Virgin (b. 1567)
1628 – Rudolph Goclenius, German lexicographer and philosopher (b. 1547)
1651 – Tokugawa Iemitsu, Japanese shōgun (b. 1604)
1714 – Sophia of Hanover (b. 1630)
1716 – Johann Wilhelm, Elector Palatine, German son of Landgravine Elisabeth Amalie of Hesse-Darmstadt (b. 1658)
1727 – August Hermann Francke, German-Lutheran pietist, philanthropist, and scholar (b. 1663)
1768 – Johann Joachim Winckelmann, German archaeologist and scholar (b. 1717)
1771 – George Montagu-Dunk, 2nd Earl of Halifax, English politician, Lord Lieutenant of Ireland (b. 1716)
1795 – Louis XVII of France (b. 1785)
1809 – Thomas Paine, English-American theorist and author (b. 1737)
1831 – Sarah Siddons, Welsh actress (b. 1755)
1835 – Gian Domenico Romagnosi, Italian economist and jurist (b. 1761)
1845 – Andrew Jackson, American general, judge, and politician, 7th President of the United States (b. 1767) 
1846 – Rodolphe Töpffer, Swiss teacher, author, painter, cartoonist, and caricaturist (b. 1799)
1857 – Douglas William Jerrold, English journalist and playwright (b. 1803)
1874 – Cochise, American tribal chief (b. 1805)
1876 – George Sand, French author and playwright (b. 1804)
1885 – Ignace Bourget, Canadian bishop (b. 1799)
1889 – Gerard Manley Hopkins, English poet (b. 1844)
1899 – Mary of the Divine Heart, German nun and saint (b. 1863)

1901–present
1924 – Andrew Irvine, English mountaineer and explorer (b. 1902)
  1924   – George Mallory, English mountaineer (b. 1886)
1945 – Karl Hanke, Polish-German soldier and politician (b. 1903)
1951 – Eugène Fiset, Canadian physician, general, and politician, 18th Lieutenant Governor of Quebec (b. 1874)
  1951   – Oswald Pohl, German SS officer (b. 1892)
1956 – Marie Laurencin, French painter and sculptor (b. 1883)
1959 – Leslie Johnson, English racing driver (b. 1912)
1965 – Edmondo Rossoni, Italian politician (b. 1884)
1966 – Anton Melik, Slovenian geographer and academic (b. 1890)
1968 – Elizabeth Enright, American author and illustrator (b. 1909)
  1968   – Ludovico Scarfiotti, Italian racing driver (b. 1933)
1969 – Arunachalam Mahadeva, Sri Lankan politician and diplomat (b. 1885)
  1969   – Robert Taylor, American actor and singer (b. 1911)
1970 – Abraham Maslow, American psychologist and academic (b. 1908)
1971 – J. I. Rodale, American author and playwright (b. 1898)
1976 – Thorleif Schjelderup-Ebbe, Norwegian zoologist and psychologist (b. 1894)
1982 – Satchel Paige, American baseball player (b. 1906)
1984 – Gordon Jacob, English composer and academic (b. 1895)
1987 – Alexander Iolas, Egyptian-American art collector (b. 1907)
1997 – George Turner, Australian author and critic (b. 1916)
  1997   – Karen Wetterhahn, American chemist and academic (b. 1948)
1998 – Sani Abacha, Nigerian general and politician, 10th President of Nigeria (b. 1943)
  1998   – Maria Reiche, German mathematician and archaeologist (b. 1903)
2000 – Frédéric Dard, French author and screenwriter (b. 1921)
2001 – Alex de Renzy, American director and producer (b. 1935)
2004 – Charles Hyder, American astrophysicist and academic (b. 1930)
  2004   – Mack Jones, American baseball player (b. 1938)
2006 – Jaxon, American illustrator and publisher, co-founded Rip Off Press (b. 1941)
  2006   – Matta El Meskeen, Egyptian monk, theologian, and author (b. 1919)
2009 – Omar Bongo, Gabonese captain and politician, President of Gabon (b. 1935)
2012 – Charles E. M. Pearce, New Zealand-Australian mathematician and academic (b. 1940)
  2012   – Ghassan Tueni, Lebanese journalist, academic, and politician (b. 1926)
2013 – Paul Cellucci, American soldier and politician, 69th Governor of Massachusetts (b. 1948)
  2013   – Yoram Kaniuk,  Israeli painter, journalist, and critic (b. 1930)
  2013   – Taufiq Kiemas, Indonesian politician, 5th First Spouse of Indonesia (b. 1942)
2014 – Alexander Imich, Polish-American chemist, parapsychologist, and academic (b. 1903)
  2014   – Yoshihito, Prince Katsura of Japan (b. 1948)
2015 – Chea Sim, Cambodian commander and politician (b. 1932) 
2017 – Sam Panopoulos, Greek cook (b. 1934)
2018 – Anthony Bourdain, American chef and travel documentarian (b. 1956)
2019 – Andre Matos, Brazilian heavy metal musician (b. 1971)
2022 – Paula Rego, Portuguese-British visual artist (b. 1935)

Holidays and observances
 Christian feast day:
 Blessed Mariam Thresia Chiramel Mankidiyan
 Blessed Mary of the Divine Heart (Droste zu Vischering)
 Chlodulf of Metz
 Jacques Berthieu, S.J.
 Jadwiga (Hedwig) of Poland
 Medard
 Melania the Elder
 Roland Allen (Episcopal Church (USA))
 Thomas Ken (Church of England)
 William of York
 June 8 (Eastern Orthodox liturgics)
 Earliest day on which Queen's Birthday can fall, while June 14 is the latest; celebrated on the second Monday in June. (Australia, except Western Australia and Queensland)
 Bounty Day (Norfolk Island)
 Caribbean American HIV/AIDS Awareness Day
 Engineer's Day (Peru)
 Primož Trubar Day (Slovenia)
 World Brain Tumor Day
 World Oceans Day

References

External links

 
 
 

Days of the year
June